Martin Meyerson (November 14, 1922 – June 2, 2007) was an American city planner and academic leader best known for serving as the President of the University of Pennsylvania (Penn) from 1970 to 1981. Meyerson, through his research, mentorship, essays and consulting, exerted formative influence on U.S. postwar urban policy at the municipal and federal levels.

Career
Meyerson was born in Brooklyn, New York in 1922 and graduated from Columbia University. He then obtained his MA in city planning from Harvard University, and began working for the Philadelphia City Planning Commission. In 1948, he became an assistant professor at the University of Chicago.

In 1952 Meyerson came to University of Pennsylvania as associate professor of city and regional planning (in the Graduate School of Fine Arts). In 1957 he moved to Harvard as a full professor (the "Williams Professor"). From 1963 to 1966 he served as dean of the College of Environmental Design at the University of California, Berkeley; he was the acting chancellor in 1965 during the student unrest there, and is credited with helping to defuse the tension that had built up on that campus.  According to UC President Clark Kerr, Meyerson thereby became the first Jew to serve as the leader of a major American research university, but he was unable to secure a permanent appointment as chancellor due to a combination of tactical errors on his part and antisemitism among the UC Board of Regents.

From 1966 to 1970, Meyerson was professor of public policy and president of the State University of New York at Buffalo. At the University at Buffalo, he broke ground and laid plans for the Amherst Campus, and presided over a period when students were active in demonstrating for rights. In 1970, he returned to Penn as its president. He remained in that post until 1981. During his tenure, he consolidated several colleges and programs into the school of arts and sciences and introduced its first affirmative action and equal opportunity programs for minorities and women.

After Penn
Meyerson retired from the university presidency in January 1981, but remained active at Penn as University Professor of Public Policy Analysis and City and Regional Planning and as chair of the University of Pennsylvania Foundation, the University of Pennsylvania Press (1984-1997; then chair emeritus), the Institute for Research on Higher Education, and the Monell Chemical Senses Center. He co-chaired Penn's 250th anniversary celebration (1990). He served on the boards of the Mahoney Institute of Neurological Sciences, the Lauder Institute of Management and International Studies, and the Institute for Strategic Threat Analysis and Response. He chaired the University's Fels Center of Government program until February 1996. In 1993 he and his wife were elected as co-presidents of the Friends of the Library, in which capacity they served on the Library's Board of Overseers.

Meyerson headed the selection committee for the Philadelphia Liberty Medal (1988 to 2005).

An expert on urban and industrial development, Meyerson was a United Nations advisor and delegate, as well as a consultant to several West African nations and to the Governor of the Tokyo Metropolitan Area. He founded London's Centre for Environmental Studies and Japan's International Centre for the Study of East Asian Development. He was an advisor to France's Institut National de la Communication Audiovisuelle. He chaired the International Institute for Education and President of the International Association of Universities. He held leadership positions with many US organizations dedicated to urban affairs, education, science, foreign policy, conservation, and the arts. He served on several White House task forces and on the councils of government agencies.

Meyerson was a trustee and senior fellow of the Aspen Institute and held planning positions with the Chicago Housing Authority, Chicago's Michael Reese Hospital, and the Philadelphia City Planning Commission. He was also a director of a number of corporations, a member of the Senior Executives Council of the Conference Board, and a senior advisor to Arthur D. Little.

Meyerson was a fellow of the American Academy of Arts and Sciences, the American Association for the Advancement of Science, the Royal Society of Arts in Great Britain, the American Institute of Certified Planners, and an academician of the European Academy for Arts, Sciences, and Letters. He was on the executive committee of the American Philosophical Society and a member of the Council on Foreign Relations and the National Academy of Education.

He was also decorated by the governments of France, Italy, and Japan. He received numerous prizes and held over 20 honorary degrees, including a doctor of laws degree conferred by Penn in 1970.

Published works
Meyerson's books included:
Politics, Planning, and Public Interest
Housing, People, and Cities
Face of the Metropolis
Boston: The Job Ahead
Gladly Learn and Gladly Teach (with Dr. Dilys Winegrad, director and curator of the Arthur Ross Gallery)
Franklin and His Heirs at the University of Pennsylvania, 1740-1976.

Personal
Meyerson married Margy Ellin in 1946. They had two sons and a daughter. He died of prostate cancer in June 2007.

References

1922 births
2007 deaths
Columbia University alumni
Harvard University alumni
Harvard University faculty
University of Chicago faculty
University of California, Berkeley faculty
University of Pennsylvania faculty
Leaders of the University at Buffalo
Leaders of the University of California, Berkeley
People from Brooklyn
Chief Administrators of the University of Pennsylvania
Members of the American Philosophical Society
People from Buffalo, New York
20th-century American academics